Michael Rock is an American graphic designer and recipient of the National Design Award.

Biography

Rock received his B.A. in Humanities from Union College in 1981, before going on to receive his M.F.A. in Graphic Design from the Rhode Island School of Design.

In 1994, Rock, alongside designers Susan Sellers and Georgianna Stout, founded 2x4, a design firm based in New York City.

He is currently the Director of the Graphic Architecture Project at Columbia University's Graduate School of Architecture, Planning and Preservation. He is also a member of the graphic design faculty at the Yale School of Art.

Recognition

Rock is the recipient of the 1999 Rome Prize in Design, and in 2006, was awarded the National Design Award.

As winner of the National Design Award, Rock was invited with other winners to the White House. Rock gained notoriety as one of the signers of a letter to the White House declining the invitation. Also signing the letter were co-winners Susan Sellers, Georgianna Stout, Paula Scher, and Stefan Sagmeister.

References

External links
 2x4 website

American graphic designers
Living people
Rhode Island School of Design faculty
Columbia Graduate School of Architecture, Planning and Preservation faculty
Year of birth missing (living people)